WALD (1080 kHz) is an AM radio station licensed to Johnsonville, South Carolina.  The station is part of the Worship and Word Network and is owned by Glory Communications, Inc., based in St. Stephen, South Carolina.  It carries an Urban Gospel radio format including Christian talk and teaching programs.  WALD serves an area of South Carolina located between Charleston, Myrtle Beach and Florence.

WALD is a daytimer station.  By day, it is powered at 9,000 watts, using a non-directional antenna.  But because AM 1080 is a clear channel frequency reserved for KRLD Dallas and WTIC Hartford, WALD must sign off at sunset to avoid interference.  During critical hours, the station broadcasts at 2,700 watts.

WALD programming is simulcast on FM translator station W254DG at 98.7 MHz in Scranton, South Carolina.

References

External links

ALD
Radio stations established in 2000
ALD